The siege of Bergen op Zoom (8 March 1814), took place during the War of the Sixth Coalition between a British force led by Thomas Graham, 1st Baron Lynedoch and a French garrison under Guilin Laurent Bizanet and Jean-Jacques Ambert. The initial British assault force seized part of the defences, but a well-managed French counterattack compelled much of the assault force to surrender.

Assault
French General Guilin Laurent Bizanet had 2,700 soldiers in the garrison when, under cover of night and using local intelligence, Graham attacked. The French, however, were positioned well, and the population  allied with them as they fought in the streets. The attacking British troops took heavy casualties. General Bizanet remained in control of Bergen op Zoom until a peace accord was signed.

Forces and casualties
One source named Bizanet as the governor and Jean-Jacques Ambert as the French commander. The 2,700-man French garrison sustained 500 killed and wounded and 100 captured during the action. Of the 4,000 troops in the British assault force, 2,100 were killed, wounded or captured. In addition to the units listed below, the source counted the 2nd Battalion of the 35th Foot in the assault force. The Guards Brigade consisted of three companies of the 1st Foot Guards and four companies each of the 2nd Foot Guards and 3rd Foot Guards, all from the 2nd Battalions of the regiments.

British Order of Battle
Graham formed his troops into four columns as follows:

Notes

References

Further reading

External links

Bergen op Zoom (1814)
Battles inscribed on the Arc de Triomphe
Bergen op Zoom (1814)
Bergen op Zoom (1814)
Bergen op Zoom (1814)
Bergen op Zoom (1814)
Conflicts in 1814
1814 in the Netherlands
Bergen op Zoom (1814)
Battles in North Brabant
History of Bergen op Zoom